Koppies Dam is a combined gravity and arch type dam located on the Renoster River, near Koppies, Free State, South Africa. It was established in 1911 and its primary purpose is to serve for irrigation and domestic use. The hazard potential of the dam has been ranked high (3).

See also
List of reservoirs and dams in South Africa
List of rivers of South Africa

References 

 List of South African Dams from the Department of Water Affairs and Forestry (South Africa)

Dams in South Africa
Dams completed in 1911
1911 establishments in South Africa